The Mark of Zorro is a 1940 American black-and-white swashbuckling Western film from 20th Century Fox, directed by Rouben Mamoulian, produced by Darryl F. Zanuck, and starring Tyrone Power, Linda Darnell, and Basil Rathbone. The supporting cast features Eugene Pallette, Gale Sondergaard, and Robert Lowery (the second actor to portray Batman on film).

The Mark of Zorro was nominated for an Academy Award for Best Original Score. The film was named to the National Film Registry in 2009 by the Library of Congress for being "culturally, historically or aesthetically significant", and to be preserved for all time.

The film is based on the novel The Curse of Capistrano by Johnston McCulley, originally published in 1919 in five serialized installments in All-Story Weekly, which introduced the masked hero Zorro; the story is set in Southern California during the early 19th century. After the enormous success of the silent 1920 film adaptation, the novel was republished under that name by Grosset & Dunlap.

Plot
Don Diego Vega is urgently called home by his father. To all outward appearances, he is the foppish son of wealthy ranchero, the former alcalde Don Alejandro Vega, having returned to Alta California after his military education in Spain.

Don Diego is horrified at the way the common people are now mistreated by the corrupt Alcalde, Luis Quintero, who had forced his father from that position of leadership. Don Diego quickly adopts the guise of El Zorro ("The Fox"), a masked outlaw dressed entirely in black, who becomes the defender of the common people and a champion for justice against the uncaring Quintero and his garrison of soldiers.

In the meantime, he romances the alcalde's beautiful and innocent niece, Lolita, whom he grows to love. As part of his plan, Don Diego simultaneously flirts with the alcalde's wife Inez, filling her head with tales of Madrid fashion and culture while raising her desire to move to Spain with her corrupt husband, Luis.

In both his guises, Don Diego must always contend with the governor's most capable henchman, the malevolent and deadly Captain Esteban Pasquale. When the current situation comes to a head, he eventually dispatches the captain during a fast-moving rapier duel-to-the-death, as the alcalde looks on in astonishment. This action leads to a forced regime change with the help of the people of Los Angeles, the other landowners, and his father. This was Don Diego's long-term plan for change from the time he arrived back in California and saw just how bad things had become in Los Angeles during his absence.

Cast

 Tyrone Power as Don Diego Vega/Zorro
 Linda Darnell as Lolita Quintero
 Basil Rathbone as Captain Esteban Pasquale
 Gale Sondergaard as Inez Quintero
 Eugene Pallette  as Friar Felipe
 J. Edward Bromberg as Don Luis Quintero
 Montagu Love as Don Alejandro Vega
 Janet Beecher as Senora Isabella Vega
 George Regas as Sergeant Gonzales
 Chris-Pin Martin as Turnkey
 Robert Lowery as Rodrigo
 Belle Mitchell as Maria
 John Bleifer as Pedro
 Frank Puglia as Proprietor
 Eugene Borden as Officer of the Day
 Pedro de Cordoba as Don Miguel
 Guy D'Ennery as Don José
 Stanley Andrews as Commanding Officer (uncredited) 
 Fortunio Bonanova as Sentry (uncredited) 
 Charles Stevens as José (uncredited)

Remake and music score
The Mark of Zorro (1974) is a made-for-television remake film starring Frank Langella and co-starring Ricardo Montalbán in the roles of Power and Rathbone. It reuses Alfred Newman's original film score, along with new incidental music composed by Dominic Frontiere.

Portions of Newman’s original music score were reused by composer Ian Fraser for the George Hamilton swashbuckling comedy film Zorro, the Gay Blade (1981). The film's storyline is a tongue-in-cheek sequel to the original 1940 film.

1920 silent version

The Mark of Zorro is a sound remake of the lavish 1920 smash-hit silent film starring Douglas Fairbanks as Zorro and Noah Beery Sr. as Sergeant Gonzales. This film depiction includes Don Diego's mother, Isabella, but it omits Bernardo (Don Diego's mute servant). That 1920 feature introduced Zorro's iconic all-black costume, subsequently incorporated into Johnston McCulley's later Zorro stories in his original fiction series upon which Fairbanks' film had been based. The 1920 film was the first in a popular array of swashbuckler action features starring the acrobatic Fairbanks, who had previously appeared mainly in comedies. Clips from the film were incorporated into The Artist nine decades later.

Acknowledging that director Mamoulian’s 1940 version is a “tongue-in-cheek” remake of the Douglas Fairbanks' 1920 swashbuckler, film critic Todd Wiener observes:

Batman connection
In the DC Comics continuity, The Mark of Zorro was established as the film that the eight-year-old Bruce Wayne had seen with his parents, Thomas and Martha, at a movie theater, only moments before they were killed in front of him by an armed thug (later retconned to be Joe Chill). Zorro is often portrayed as Bruce's childhood hero and an influence on his Batman persona. Discrepancies exist regarding which version Bruce saw: The Dark Knight Returns claims it was the Tyrone Power version, whereas a story by Alan Grant claimed it to be the silent Douglas Fairbanks original. Bill Finger was himself inspired by Fairbanks' Zorro, including similarities in costumes, the "Bat Cave" and Zorro's cave, and unexpected secret identities, especially since the Batman character antedates the Tyrone Power remake by a year. In Batman v Superman: Dawn of Justice (set in the DCEU continuity), Bruce and his parents leave a screening of 1940's The Mark of Zorro the night of their murder.

In the animated series Justice League Unlimited, a flashback of the fateful night establishes that for DCAU continuity, Bruce and his parents were attending The Mark of Zorro, but does not indicate which version. In earlier episodes of Batman: The Animated Series, the fictional character the Gray Ghost, a pulp-fiction hero inspired by The Shadow, is the inspiration to young Bruce Wayne.

In Todd Phillips' 2019 film Joker, the marquee above the theater young Bruce and his parents exit shows the 1981 films Blow Out and Zorro, the Gay Blade as playing.

Home media
The Mark of Zorro has been released twice on DVD. The first was on October 7, 2003, and featured the film in its original black-and-white, as part of 20th Century Fox Studio Classics Collection. The second was released on October 18, 2005, as a Special Edition, featuring both a newly restored black-and-white version and a colorized version, prepared by Legend Films. Both contain the short film "Tyrone Power: The Last Idol" as seen on Biography on the A&E Network, with a commentary by film critic Richard Schickel. Kino Lorber released the film on Blu-ray in 2016.

References

Further reading
Todd Weiner. 2004. The Mark of Zorro, 1940. UCLA Film and Television Archive: 12th Festival of Preservation, July 22 – August 21, 2004. Festival guest handbook.

External links

 
 
 
 
 

1940 films
1940 Western (genre) films
1940s English-language films
20th Century Fox films
American Western (genre) films
American black-and-white films
Films based on American novels
Films based on works by Johnston McCulley
Films directed by Rouben Mamoulian
Films produced by Darryl F. Zanuck
Films scored by Alfred Newman
Films set in California
Films set in the 19th century
Films with screenplays by Bess Meredyth
Sound film remakes of silent films
United States National Film Registry films
Zorro films
Films with screenplays by Garrett Fort
1940s American films